Allen Campbell (December 30, 1956 - August 20, 1994) was an American zookeeper and elephant trainer and handler in his hometown of Jacksonville, Florida before moving to work in the Baton Rouge Zoo in the mid-1970s as the elephant keeper and trainer.

He also ran the first elephant ride there. He advanced elephant care at the Baton Rouge Zoo by insisting that all of the elephants not just should but must be fed and watered and their enclosure cleaned every night as well as every day. He usually did this himself and was known to be a workaholic. He contracted to run the elephant ride and provide a baby elephant mascot for the Denver Zoo in 1986. He worked as an elephant consultant for many zoos including the National Zoo in Washington, D.C. He was heavily influenced by circus trainer Rex Williams and his life's ambition was to have a circus elephant act. He eventually worked as an elephant trainer for The Hawthorn Corporation. 

Campbell was crushed to death on August 20, 1994, at the Neal S. Blaisdell Center in Honolulu, Hawaii, after attempting to save fellow co-worker Dallas Beckwith from the performing elephant Tyke, who had run amok. This is the same elephant that, according to USDA and Canadian law enforcement documents, while performing with Tarzan Zerbini Circus, was involved when "The elephant handler was observed beating the elephant in public to the point [where] the elephant was screaming and bending down on three legs to avoid being hit. Even when the handler walked by the elephant after this, the elephant screamed and veered away, demonstrating fear from his presence."

Allen Campbell's autopsy revealed that he had cocaine in his system, which he had obtained from another animal trainer friend of his also in the circus as well as alcohol at the time of his death. Officials at the Denver Zoo confirm that Campbell was the subject of complaints in the late 1980s that he abused zoo elephants while running an elephant and camel ride concession in Denver.

References

1956 births
1994 deaths
Accidental deaths in Hawaii
American circus performers
Deaths due to animal attacks in the United States
Deaths due to elephant attacks
People from Jacksonville, Florida
Zookeepers
Elephant trainers